Janasheen is a 2003 Indian Hindi-language romantic action thriller film co-written, edited, produced and directed by Feroz Khan who stars along with his son, Fardeen Khan, and Celina Jaitly. It was partly shot in Afghanistan and Thailand.

Plot 
Lucky Kapoor (Fardeen Khan) lives in Australia and has no interest in taking over his father, Virendra Kapoor's (Harsh Chhaya) business in India. Meanwhile, Saba Karim Shah (Feroz Khan) has a great interest in a plot of land owned by Mr. Kapoor, but Mr. Kapoor has no interest in selling. Shah thus has Mr. Kapoor killed, making it look like an accident. Jessica Periera (Celina Jaitly), a childhood sweetheart of Lucky, has proof that Mr. Kapoor's death was not an accident—but she keeps it to herself. When Karim Shah meets with Lucky to renegotiate, he finds that Lucky is willing to sell—but he also discovers that Lucky bears a striking resemblance to his own dead son. Although Karim Shah will do anything to make Lucky heir to his own wealth and properties, Lucky remains unwilling.

Cast 
 Feroz Khan as Saba Karim Shah
 Fardeen Khan as Lucky Kapoor/Hams
 Celina Jaitly as Jessica Periera
 Harsh Chhaya as Virendra Kapoor
 Yash Tonk as Max Periera
 Kashmera Shah as Tina
 Pinky Harwani as Reema
 Mangal Dhillon as Jaichand
 Johnny Lever as Johnny Chen
 Archana Puran Singh as Martha

Soundtrack

Reception

Critical response 
Smitha Parigi of Rediff.com wrote "Overall, the film is eye-candy. Skin and the landscapes of Australia are in lush abundance. Like any Feroz Khan film, watch the film only for style." Namrata Joshi of Outlook India gave the film 1 out of 5 stars stating "Watching the film is like feasting on cold and congealed leftovers of yesterday."

Awards 
Winner:
IIFA Award for Best Performance in a Negative Role – Feroz Khan

Nominated:
IIFA Award for Best Film – Feroz Khan
IIFA Award for Best Supporting Actor – Yash Tonk
IIFA Award for Best Story – Feroz Khan

References

External links 

2003 films
2000s Hindi-language films
Films directed by Feroz Khan
Fictional Afghan people
Films shot in Afghanistan
Films scored by Anand Raj Anand
Indian action thriller films
2003 action thriller films
Indian romantic action films
2000s romantic action films
Films scored by Channi Singh
Films scored by Sukhwinder Singh
Films scored by Biddu